Hugo Philipp (born 1884, date of death unknown) was an Austrian fencer. He competed in the team foil competitions at the 1924 Summer Olympics.

References

External links
 

1884 births
Year of death missing
Austrian male fencers
Austrian foil fencers
Olympic fencers of Austria
Fencers at the 1924 Summer Olympics